"Baby, Don't Change Your Mind" is a 1977 single by Gladys Knight & The Pips. It was originally performed by The Stylistics on their 1976 album Fabulous. The song was written by Van McCoy, who had a disco hit himself with "The Hustle". McCoy would go on to write "Come Back and Finish What You Started", a hit for Gladys Knight & the Pips in 1978.

"Baby, Don't Change Your Mind" was the first of three singles released from the album Still Together. It reached number 4 in the UK, making it their last Top 5 hit in the UK. In the US the song reached number 52 on the Hot 100 and number 10 on the US R&B Charts.

Track listing

7" Single 

A - Baby, Don't Change Your Mind - 3:15

B - I Love To Feel That Feeling - 3:30

7" Promo Single 

A - Baby, Don't Change Your Mind (Stereo) - 3:15

B -  Baby, Don't Change Your Mind (Mono) - 3:15

Charts

References

External links
 Gladys Knight & The Pips - Baby, Don't Change Your Mind on Discogs
 Music Video on YouTube

1976 songs
1977 singles
The Stylistics songs
Gladys Knight & the Pips songs
Songs written by Van McCoy
Buddah Records singles